Petrusevičius is the Lithuanian-language form of the Polish surname Petrusewicz. Feminine forms: Petruševičienė (surname by husband),  Petrusevičiūtė (maiden name)

Notable people with surname include:

Algirdas Petrusevičius, Lithuanian anti-Soviet dissident, partisan and political prisoner

Lithuanian-language surnames
Surnames of Polish origin
Patronymic surnames